This is a list of highways in Newfoundland and Labrador.  Newfoundland and Labrador is unusual among jurisdictions in Canada in that it exclusively uses highway marker signs that do not use either the province's name, symbols, or other official insignia.

Main provincial highways
List of Newfoundland and Labrador highways that traverse both the island and mainland part of the province and those that lead into distinct regions of the province.

Regional roads
Main transportation routes leading into and around the various regions of the province sorted by regions.

Avalon Peninsula and Isthmus Region
Route 2, Pitts Memorial Drive and Peacekeeper's Way
Route 3, Robert E. Howlett Memorial Drive
Route 3A, Team Gushue Highway
Route 10, Southern Shore Highway (eastern side of Irish Loop Drive)
Route 11, Petty Harbour Road
Route 13, Witless Bay Line
Route 20, Torbay Road and Pouch Cove Road
Route 21, Bauline Line
Route 30, Logy Bay Road
Route 40, Portugal Cove Road
Route 41, Beachy Cove Road
Route 50, Thorburn Road
Route 60, Topsail Road and Conception Bay Highway
Route 61, Foxtrap Access Road
Route 62, Holyrood Access Road
Route 63, Avondale Access Road
Route 70, Roaches Line and Conception Bay North Highway
Route 71, Hodgewater Line
Route 72, Port de Grave Road
Route 73, New Harbour Road
Route 74, Heart's Content Highway
Route 75, Veterans Memorial Highway 
Route 80, Trinity Road
Route 81, Markland Road
Route 90, Salmonier Line and St. Mary's Bay Highway (western portion of the Irish Loop Drive)
Route 91, Old Placentia Highway
Route 92, North Harbour-Branch Highway
Route 93, Mount Carmel Road
Route 94, Admirals Beach Road
Route 100, Argentia Access Road and Cape Shore Highway
Route 101, Long Harbour Access Road
Route 102, Fox Harbour Road and Ship Harbour Road
Route 201, Chapel Arm-Bellevue Road (Osprey Trail)
Route 202, Long Harbour Road
Route 203, Fair Haven Road

Burin Peninsula
Route 210, Heritage Run (Burin Peninsula Highway)
Route 211, English Harbour East Road
Route 212, Bay L'Argent Road
Route 213, Garnish Road
Route 214, Monkstown Road
Route 215, Petit Forte Road
Route 220, Burin Peninsula Highway
Route 220A, Creston Boulevard
Route 221, Burin Road
Route 222, Salt Pond-Winterland Road

Bonavista Peninsula and area
Route 204, Southwest Arm Road
Route 205, Hatchet Cove Road
Route 230, Discovery Trail (Bonavista Peninsula Highway)
Route 230A, Old Bonavista Peninsula Highway
Route 231, Random Island Road
Route 232, Smith Sound Road
Route 233, Clode Sound Road
Route 234, Winter Brook Road
Route 235, Bonavista Bay Highway
Route 236, Stock Cove Road
Route 237, Blackhead Bay Road
Route 238, Elliston Road
Route 239, New Bonaventure Road

Kittiwake Coast, Fogo Island and Twillingate areas
Route 301, Terra Nova Road
Route 310, Road to the Beaches
Route 320, Road to the Shore, east side
Route 330, Road to the Shore, west side
Route 331, Boyd's Cove Highway
Route 332, Frederickton Road
Route 333, Fogo Island Road
Route 334, Joe Batt's Arm Road
Route 335, Farewell Road
Route 340, Road to the Isles
Route 341, Laurenceton Road
Route 342, Embree Road
Route 343, Road to Comfort Cove
Route 344, Cottlesville Road
Route 345, Moreton's Harbour Road
Route 346, Toogood Arm Road

Exploits River Valley and Bay d'Espoir region
Route 350, Botwood Highway
Route 351, Rattling Brook Road
Route 352, Fortune Harbour Road
Route 360, Bay d'Espoir Highway
Route 361, St. Albans Road
Route 362, Belleoram Road
Route 363, Coomb's Cove Road
Route 364, Hermitage River Road
Route 365, Conne River Road
Route 370, Buchans Highway
Route 371, Millertown Junction Road (believed to be abandoned)

Baie Verte Region
Route 380, Beothuk Trail
Route 381, Port Anson Road
Route 382, Long Island Tickle Road
Route 390, Springdale Road
Route 391, Harry's Harbour Road
Route 392, Beachside Road
Route 410, Dorset Trail
Route 411, Purbeck's Cove Road
Route 412, Seal Cove Road
Route 413, Burlington Road
Route 414, La Scie Highway
Route 415, Nippers Harbour Road
Route 416, Round Harbour Road
Route 417, Pacquet Road
Route 418, Ming's Bight Road
Route 419, Wild Cove Road

Great Northern Peninsula and area
Route 401, Howley Road
Route 420, White Bay South Highway
Route 421, Hampden Road
Route 422, Cormack Road
Route 430, The Viking Trail (Great Northern Peninsula Highway)
Route 431, Bonne Bay Road
Route 432, Main Brook Highway
Route 433, Englee Highway
Route 434, Conche Road
Route 435, Cook's Harbour Road
Route 436, L'Anse aux Meadows Road
Route 437, Cape Onion Road
Route 438, Croque Road

Western Newfoundland
Route 402, Gallants Road
Route 403, Flat Bay Road
Route 404, Robinsons Road
Route 405, Highlands Road
Route 406, Codroy Road
Route 407, St. Andrews-Searston Road
Route 408, Cape Ray Road
Route 440, Admiral Palliser's Trail (formerly North Shore Highway)
Route 450, Captain Cook's Trail (formerly South Shore Highway)
Route 450A, Lewin Parkway
Route 460, White's Road / Hansen Memorial Highway / Kippens Road / Port au Port Highway 

Route 461, St. George's Highway
Route 462, Point au Mal Road
Route 463, Lourdes Road
Route 470, La Poile Highway
Route 480, Burgeo Highway
Route 490, Stephenville Access Road

Labrador
Route 500, Trans-Labrador Highway
Route 503, Grenfell Drive
Route 510, Labrador South Highway
Route 513, St. Lewis Highway
Route 514, Charlottetown Highway
Route 516, Cartwright Highway
Route 520, Northwest River Road

Local roads
There is also an extensive system of numbered local roads in Newfoundland and Labrador. These roads are numbered based on an intersecting primary highway, with another two-digit number following a dash (i.e. 210-01).

Avalon Peninsula and Isthmus Region
Route 10-30, Tors Cove Road
Route 10-32, Burnt Cove Road
Route 10-33, La Manche Road
Route 10-34, Brigus South
Route 10-35, Admirals Cove Road
Route 10-37, Calvert Road
Route 10-42, Port Kirwan Road
Route 10-45, Kingmans Road
Route 10-46, Wharf Road in Renews
Route 10-50, Portugal Cove South Road
Route 10-52, St. Shott's Road
Route 20-16, Indian Meal Line (linking Torbay and Portugal Cove)
Route 20-17, Wind Gap Road (to Flatrock)
Route 20-19, Pouch Cove Line
Route 20-21, Pine Line in Torbay
Route 30-16, Middle Cove Road
Route 31-11, Road to Memorial University of Newfoundland Marine Sciences Laboratory
Route 40-12, Old Broad Cove Road in Portugal Cove-St. Philips
Route 40-15, Bauline Line in Portugal Cove-St. Philips
Route 41-10, Witch Hazel Road in Portugal Cove-St. Philips
Route 50-17, Tolt Road in Portugal Cove-St. Philips
Route 50-25, Bennetts Road in Portugal Cove-St. Philips
Route 60-23, Holyrood Thermal Generating Station Road
Route 60-17, Terminal Road in Foxtrap
Route 60-24, Chapels Cove Road
Route 60-30, Cemetery Road in Conception Harbour
Route 60-31, Colliers Harbour Road
Route 60-33, New Line Road
Route 60-34, Marysvale Road
Route 60-35, Old Mill Road
Route 60-36, Georgetown Road
Route 60-37, Church Road in Georgetown
Route 60-39, Path End Road
Route 60-40, Curnews Road
Route 70-10, Mahers Road
Route 70-11, Goulds Ridge Road
Route 70-13, Bareneed Road
Route 70-17, Cranes Road (to Upper Island Cove)
Route 70-18, Thickett Road (to Upper Island Cove)
Route 70-20, Bryants Cove Road
Route 70-24, Glover Road (near Harbour Grace)
Route 70-30, Freshwater Road (not to be confused with street in St. John's)
Route 70-32, Flatrock Road (in Carbonear)
Route 70-33, Old North Shore Highway (Victoria to Salmon Cove)
Route 70-37, Perry's Cove Road
Route 70-42, Bradleys Cove Road
Route 70-43, Western Bay Line
Route 70-51, Lower Island Cove Road
Route 70-53, Caplin Cove Road
Route 70-54, Low Point Road
Route 70-56, Red Head Cove Road
Route 70-57, New Road in Red Head Cove
Route 70-58, Back Road in Grates Cove
Route 70-61, Grates Cove Road
Route 70-62, North River Road
Route 70-63, Country Road in Bay Roberts
Route 70-64, Shearstown Road
Route 80-10, Spread Eagle Road (near Old Shop)
Route 80-10-1, Old Shop Road
Route 80-15, Dildo Harbour Road
Route 80-16, Dildo Road
Route 80-18, Andersons Cove Road
Route 80-19, Harbour Drive in New Harbour
Route 80-20, West Side Road in Hopeall
Route 80-20-1, Old Hopeall Road
Route 80-21, Hopeall Road
Route 80-22, West Side Road in Greens Harbour
Route 80-23, Crocker's Cove Road
Route 80-24, Old Main Road in Whiteway
Route 80-31, Hants Harbour Road
Route 100-17, Point Lance Road
Route 100-20, Ferndale Road
Route 201-14, Access Road to Bellevue
Route 202-10, Long Harbour Local Road
Route 2-1-01, Little Harbour East Road
Route 2-1-02, Southern Harbour Road
Route 2-1-03, Arnold's Cove Road
Route 2-1-04, Arnold's Cove Station Road
Route 2-1-05, Come By Chance Refinery Road
Route 2-1-06, Come By Chance Road
Route 2-1-07, Sunnyside Road

Burin Peninsula
Route 210-10, Goobies Road
Route 210-11, North Harbour Road
Route 210-13, Garden Cove Road
Route 210-15, Boat Harbour West Road
Route 210-16, Spur Road in Boat Harbour
Route 210-17, Spur Road in Brookside
Route 210-23, Jean de Baie Road
Route 210-24, Spanish Room Road
Route 210-26, Spur Road in Spanish Room
Route 210-33, Spur Roads in Swift Current
Route 211-12, Spur Road in Grand Le Pierre
Route 214-10, Davis Cove Road
Route 220-10, Little Bay Road
Route 221-15, Mortier Road
Route 222-10, Winterland Road

Bonavista Peninsula and area
Route 2-1-08, Ivany's Cove Road (formerly Route 204-10)
Route 2-1-09, Deep Bight Road and Spur Roads
Route 2-1-10, Charlottetown Road
Route 204-17, Butter Cove Road
Route 204-19, Gooseberry Cove Road
Route 230-14, Sweet Bay Road and Spur Roads
Route 230-15, Trinity East Road and Spur Roads
Route 230-17, Champneys West Road and Spur Roads
Route 230-19, Champney's Arm Road
Route 230-21, English Harbour Road and Spur Roads
Route 230-26, Little Catalina Road
Route 231-10, Snook's Harbour Road
Route 231-16, Hickman's Harbour Road and Spur Roads
Route 231-19, Lower Lance Cove Road and Spur Roads
Route 233-10, Canning's Cove Road and Spur Roads
Route 233-13, Port Blandford Road and Spur Roads
Route 234-10, Lethbridge Road and Spur Roads
Route 235-13, Summerville Road
Route 235-17, Tickle Cove Road
Route 235-20, Keels Road
Route 238-11, Maberly Road
Route 239-15, Old Bonaventure Road

Kittiwake Coast, Fogo Island and Twillingate areas
Route 3-1-06, Benton Road
Route 310-11, Traytown Access Road
Route 310-13, Culls Harbour Road
Route 310-25, Happy Adventure Road
Route 310-26, Powells Cove Road
Route 310-27, Sandy Cove Road (Bonavista Bay)
Route 310-32, Burnside Road
Route 320-26, Dover Road
Route 320-33, Greenspond Road
Route 320-34, Pool's Island Road
Route 320-36, New-Wes-Valley Road (formerly Wesleyville Road)
Route 330-13, Carmanville South Road
Route 330-14, Ladle Cove Road
Route 330-16, Aspen Cove Road
Route 330-28, Cape Freels North Road
Route 330-24, Newtown Road
Route 330-45, Deadman's Bay Road
Route 331-10, Horwood Road
Route 331-11, Rodgers Cove Road
Route 333-11, Stag Harbour North Road
Route 333-16, Stag Harbour South Road
Route 333-18, Deep Bay Road
Route 333-21, Island Harbour Road
Route 335-10, Port Albert Road
Route 335-14, Change Island Road
Route 340-17, Baytona Road
Route 340-23, Boyd's Cove South Road
Route 340-27, Boyd's Cove North Road
Route 340-29, Fairbanks Road
Route 340-36, Newville Road
Route 340-37, Herring Neck Road
Route 340-46, Bayview Cove Road
Route 340-49, Little Harbour Road
Route 340-69, Old Newville Road
Route 340-73, Indian Cove Road
Route 341-10, Stanhope Road
Route 341-12, Porterville Road
Route 345-11, Virgin Arm Point Road
Route 345-17, Bridgeport Road
Route 345-20, Valleypond Road
Route 346-10 and Route 346-11, Pikes Arm Roads
Route 346-13, Rogers Cove-Cobbs Arm Road

Exploits River Valley and Bay d'Espoir Region
Route 3-1-09, Norris Arm North Road
Route 3-1-12, Wooddale Road
Route 3-1-13, Grenfell Heights Road in Grand Falls-Windsor
Route 3-1-18, Old Badger Road near Price Farm
Route 3-1-20, Old Badger Road in Badger
Route 350-13, Peterview Road
Route 350-17, Pleasantview Road
Route 350-21, Glovers Harbour Road
Route 351-10, Old Trans-Canada Highway (to the former Sir Robert Bond Bridge)
Route 361-10, Milltown Road
Route 361-11, Conne River Barasway Road
Route 361-18, St. Albans Airfield Road
Route 362-10, Pool's Cove Road
Route 363-10, English Harbour West Road
Route 363-13, Boxey Road
Route 363-15, Wreck Cove Road
Route 370-11, Millertown Road
Route 370-12, Millertown Front Road
Route 380-16, Brighton Road
Route 391-10, King's Point Road
Route 391-11, Jacksons Cove Road
Route 391-14, Langdown Cove Road

Baie Verte and White Bay region
Route 410-10, Coachman's Cove Road
Route 411-11, Bear Cove Road
Route 413-10, Smith's Harbour Road
Route 413-12, Local Road in Smith's Harbour
Route 414-10, Brent's Cove Road
Route 414-11, Harbour Round Road
Route 414-12, Tilt Cove Road
Route 414-13, Shoe Cove Road
Route 414-14, Cape St. John Road
Route 416-10, Snooks Arm Road
Route 416-11, Town of Harbour Round
Route 417-10, Woodstock East Road
Route 418-10, Local Roads in Mings Bight
Route 420-10, Pollard's Point Road
Route 421-11, Bayside Road in Hampden
Route 421-12, Loop Road in Hampden

Great Northern Peninsula and area
Route 430-15, Norris Point Road
Route 430-21, Cow Head Road
Route 430-24, Portland Creek Road
Route 430-28, Port au Choix Road
Route 430-32, Bartletts Harbour Road
Route 430-33, Castors River South Road
Route 430-34, Castors River North Road
Route 430-36, Reefs Harbour Road
Route 430-37, Brig Bay Road
Route 430-46, Bird Cove Road
Route 430-47, Plum Point Road
Route 430-48, Blue Cove Road
Route 430-49, Pond Cove Road
Route 430-50, St. Barbe Road
Route 430-52, Forresters Point Road
Route 430-56, Anchor Point Road
Route 430-68, Shoal Cove East Road
Route 430-69, Green Island Cove Road
Route 430-70, Green Island Brook Road
Route 430-71, Wharf Road in Green Island Brook
Route 430-75, St. Anthony Bight Road
Route 430-76, Great Brehat Road
Route 430-80, St. Carols Road
Route 431-10, Lomond Road
Route 431-11, Woody Point Road
Route 433-10, Bide Arm Road
Route 435-10, Wharf Road in Cook's Harbour
Route 436-11, Quirpon Road
Route 436-12, Wharf Road in St. Lunaire
Route 436-13, Wharf Road in Griquet
Route 436-15, Noddy Bay Road
Route 436-17, Straitsview Road
Route 437-10, Spur Road in Raleigh

Western
Route 4-1-06, Steel Mountain Road
Route 4-1-07, South Branch Road
Route 4-1-08, Local Roads in South Branch
Route 403-11, Station Road in St. Theresa
Route 404-11, Cartyville Road
Route 404-12, Local Roads in Jeffreys
Route 404-13, Local Roads in Robinsons
Route 404-14, Station Road in Robinsons
Route 404-15, Local Roads in Fischells
Route 404-16, Station Road in Heatherton
Route 405-10, King's Road in St. Fintans
Route 405-11, St. David's Road
Route 405-12, Maidstone Road
Route 405-13, Loch Leven Road
Route 405-14, Joe McGinn's Road in Highlands
Route 405-16, Local Roads in St. David's
Route 406-10, Local Road in Codroy
Route 406-11, Doyles Road
Route 406-12, Benoit's Siding Road
Route 406-13, O'Regans Road
Route 407-10, Radio Range Road in St. Andrews
Route 407-11, St. Andrews Post Office Road
Route 407-12, Loch Lomond-Upper Ferry Road
Route 407-13, Block Road near Searston
Route 460-10, White's Road (to Stephenville Crossing)
Route 460-11, Cold Brook Road
Route 460-13, Boswarlos Road
Route 460-14, Felix Cove-Aguathuna Road
Route 460-15, Roads in Aguathuna
Route 460-16, Romaines Road in Port au Port
Route 461-11, Mattis Point Road
Route 461-12, Shallop Cove Road
Route 463-11, Long Point Road
Route 470-10, Margaree Road
Route 470-11, Fox Roost Road
Route 470-14, Diamond Cove Road
Route 470-16, Harbour Le Cou Road

Labrador
Route 500-10, Duley Lake Road
Route 503-11, Airport Road in Labrador City
Route 510-11, L'Anse Amour Road
Route 511-10, Pinsent's Arm Road

External links

Newfoundland and Labrador Highway Cameras
Road Signs of Newfoundland & Labrador by Mark O'Neil
Newfoundland Highway Photos by Oscar Voss

References
Newfoundland and Labrador Transportation and Works - contains descriptions of most provincial numbered highways
Building Near Highways Regulations, 1997 under the Works, Services and Transportation Act, Government of Newfoundland and Labrador - contains descriptions of most of the province's local roads 

 
Newfoundland and Labrador
Highways